Clare Birgin is an Australian diplomat who was the Ambassador to Serbia from May 2007 until June 2010.  She had concurrent accreditation to Montenegro and the Former Yugoslav Republic of Macedonia, and Romania. Birgin was also Ambassador to Hungary from 2004 until 2007.

Damir Dokić was sentenced to jail time after threatening Birgin with a hand grenade “if she didn't stop negative articles about him from being published in Australia.”

Birgin earned a Bachelor of Arts degree and a master's degree in international law from the Australian National University.

Publications
Ignore the Polish election result at your peril

References

Living people
Year of birth missing (living people)
Australian women ambassadors
Ambassadors of Australia to Serbia
Ambassadors of Australia to Montenegro
Ambassadors of Australia to North Macedonia
Ambassadors of Australia to Hungary
Ambassadors of Australia to Romania
Australian National University alumni